The 2023 South African National Shutdown is a protest held by the political party EFF. The EFF are calling for the resignation of President Cyril Ramaphosa and an end to load-shedding. Julius Malema has warned businesses countrywide to close their doors or risk being looted by them.

Over 24,000 car tires were confiscated across the country by the authorities in the hours leading up to the shutdown. The authorities stated that the tires were placed in strategic locations with the likely intent to create road blocks and set alight on the day of the shutdown.

The Mail and Guardian speculated that the shutdown was a "dry-run" for the EFF's campaigning abilities in preparation for the 2024 general elections.

See also 

 2021 South African unrest
 2021 South African municipal elections
 2019 South African general election
 Service Delivery Protests (South Africa)

References 

2023 in South Africa
2023 protests
2023 riots
Civil disobedience
March 2023 crimes in Africa
March 2023 events in South Africa
Looting in Africa
Protests in South Africa
Riots and civil disorder in South Africa
Conflicts in 2023
2023 crimes in South Africa